Cir.Cuz is a Norwegian pop duo consisting of Mats Melbye from Sarpsborg and Thomas Pedersen from Skien. Their debut single "Radio" peaked at number 2 on the Norwegian Singles Chart.

Music career
The duo released their debut single "Radio" on 28 February 2011, which reached number 2 the Norwegian VG-lista charts. They began working on an album in mid-2011. They released their second single "Den Eneste" on 6 July 2011. On 17 October 2011 they released "Diva" as their third single, it entered the Norwegian VG-lista charts at number 20. They released their debut album Alt I Sin Tid on 21 November 2011.

On 28 May 2012 they released the single "Gatelys". On 30 November 2012 they released the single "Supernova" featuring vocals from Julie Bergan, which reached number 5 on the Norwegian VG-lista charts. On 29 April 2013 they released "Tidløs".  The album, Vi Er Cir.Cuz, was released on 8 November 2013.

In 2015, they had chart success with the single "Original" featuring additional vocals by Emila as a prelude to their third album Hjertet mitt slår.

Discography

Albums

Singles
As main artists

As featured artists

Other songs 
Album featured covers

Non-single remix

References

External links
Official website
Cir.Cuz on Facebook

Norwegian hip hop groups
Norwegian musical duos
Musical groups established in 2011
2011 establishments in Norway
Musical groups from Skien
Musical groups from Sarpsborg
Melodi Grand Prix contestants